Stok Monastery or Stok Gompa is a Buddhist monastery in Stok, Leh district, Ladakh, northern India, 15  kilometres south of Leh. It was founded by Lama Lhawang Lotus in the 14th Century and has a notable library including all 108 volumes of the Kangyur. A ritual dance-mask festival is held annually.

Next to the monastery is a 71-foot (22 m) high seated Gautama Buddha statue and temple, constructed between 2012-2015 and consecrated by the 14th Dalai Lama on 8 August 2016.

Around 2 km from the monastery is Stok Palace, built in 1820 as the summer home of Ladakhi royalty from the Namgyal dynasty of Ladakh.

Gallery

See also 
 Chogyal

References

Buddhist monasteries in Ladakh
Gelug monasteries and temples
Leh district